Rich Strike (foaled April 25, 2019) is an American Thoroughbred racehorse that won the 2022 Kentucky Derby, racing at 80–1 odds.

Rich Strike is the second-biggest longshot to have won the Kentucky Derby after Donerail (91–1 odds) in 1913. He was not in the field until Ethereal Road was scratched the day before, with Rich Strike being added from the also-eligible list for the Derby. Owner Richard Dawson found out about the change just 30 seconds before the deadline.

Background
Rich Strike, also known as Richie, is a chestnut colt with a white blaze and two white socks on his hind legs.  He was bred at Calumet Farm in Kentucky and was foaled on April 25, 2019. His dam, Gold Strike by Smart Strike, was the Canadian Champion Three-Year-Old Filly of 2005; he was sired by Keen Ice, best known for defeating American Pharoah in the Travers Stakes. Rich Strike became Keen Ice's first Grade I winner and Calumet Farm's record tenth Kentucky Derby winner. 

In September 2021, horse trainer Eric Reed, on behalf of Richard Dawson's RED-TR Racing, bought Rich Strike for $30,000 at a claiming race at Churchill Downs.

Jockey Sonny Leon rode Rich Strike to his victory in the 148th Kentucky Derby at Churchill Downs on May 7, 2022.

Jerry Dixon Jr., who had been groom to the horse almost since his arrival at Eric Reed’s training centre, was Rich Strike’s groom at the Kentucky Derby.

Racing career

2021: two-year-old season
Originally trained by Joe Sharp, Rich Strike made his first start on August 15, 2021, in a maiden special weight race at one mile over the turf at Ellis Park. He broke slowly and was never a factor, finishing last.

For his next start, Rich Strike was dropped into a maiden claiming race at Churchill Downs. He broke slowly and raced near the back of the pack down the backstretch, then made a strong move on the turn to take the lead. He drew off down the stretch to win by  lengths. He was claimed for $30,000 by Eric Reed.

On October 9, Rich Strike was entered in an allowance optional claiming race at Keeneland. He bobbled at the start and had to be steadied entering the first turn after being bumped. He was well back for most of the race but started to close ground in the final furlong to finish third, beaten by  lengths.

Rich Strike made his final start of the year on December 26 in the Gun Runner Stakes at Fair Grounds Race Course in New Orleans. He trailed the field through the first three-quarters of a mile before making a mild rally to finish fifth behind Epicenter.

2022: three-year-old season
Rich Strike made his three-year-old debut on January 22, 2022, in the Leonatus Stakes over the all weather surface at Turfway Park in Kentucky. As had become his pattern, he was well back in the early running then made a late run to finish third. Reed later commented that Rich Strike had lost several days of training because of weather. "In the paddock he was a monster and he's never like that," Reed said. "He didn't run terrible but he just wasn't himself."

He turned in a similar performance on March 5 in the John Battaglia Memorial Stakes, also at Turfway Park, this time finishing fourth.

For his third start of the year, Rich Strike was entered in the Jeff Ruby Steaks at Turfway on April 2. He was near the back of the field for most of the race but found an inside path in the stretch and closed well to finish third behind Tiz the Bomb.

Kentucky Derby
The third-place finish in the Jeff Ruby gave Rich Strike 20 points on the 2022 Road to the Kentucky Derby, which was originally short of the amount required to qualify for the race. At 8:45 a.m. on Friday morning, Reed was informed there were no scratches. However, the last-minute scratch of another horse, Ethereal Road, allowed him to draw into the Derby, and minutes later, Reed took another phone call from chief steward Barbara Borden, asking him if he wanted to run Rich Strike in the Derby. Reed joked that the last-minute notification left him needing cardiopulmonary resuscitation, as he had just been about to enter Rich Strike in another race, the Peter Pan Stakes at Belmont Park. "He's never been better; he loves this track," said Reed. "All week long, I was like, 'He just gets better every day.' He's so happy right now. It's just a blessing to be able to run."

The field for the 2022 Kentucky Derby, held on May 7, 2022, was considered one of the deepest in recent memory as there were multiple highly regarded horses but no clear standout. The top horses included Epicenter (Louisiana Derby, Risen Star), Zandon (Blue Grass Stakes), and Taiba (Santa Anita Derby). Rich Strike was overlooked at odds of 80-1. He broke well from the outside post position and settled into the back of the pack where he was in eighteenth place after the first half-mile, 17 lengths behind the leaders. During this time Summer is Tomorrow and Crown Pride battled up front starting the race off with an extremely fast pace. He started his move on the final turn while weaving through traffic, first shifting out four horses wide of the rail then back towards the rail. In the stretch, he was checked briefly by a tiring horse but again found racing room and launched a sustained drive to the inside of Epicenter. He drew clear in the final strides to win by three-quarters of a length. A shocked Reed collapsed in the paddock.

It was the first graded stakes win for jockey Sonny Leon, who was commended by Reed for an excellent ride. "You know we had a difficult post but I know the horse," said Leon. "I didn't know if he could win but I had a good feeling with him. I had to wait until the stretch and that's what I did. I waited and then the rail opened up. I wasn't nervous, I was excited. Nobody knows my horse like I know my horse."

After the Derby, on May 12, owner Dawson announced the horse would not run the Preakness Stakes on May 21, noting that while running the race was "very tempting", the team would stick with its original plan of passing on the Preakness after racing the Derby and entering the Belmont Stakes, thus giving up the chance to become the first Triple Crown winner since Justify in 2018.

Belmont Stakes

On 11 June, Rich Strike was entered to the Belmont Stakes and faced Todd Pletcher's pair Mo Donegal and the filly Nest and five other horses. Rich Strike was selected as the third pick in the field starting at odds of just over 4/1. Rich Strike broke in at the start bumping Nest solidly after that rival stumbled and pinched her back, raced briefly inside into the first turn before going two then three wide and then back to the two path briefly into the backstretch, tipped out and chased four wide with seven and a half furlongs to go, continued four wide through the far turn coaxed along from the half mile pole, swung four to five wide at the head of the stretch and tired finish sixth to winner Mo Donegal. Trainer Eric Reed commented after the race, "The pace was slow, but he had him where he wanted to be. He wasn't the same horse."

Travers Stakes

The Travers Stakes on August 27 attracted a very strong field, including the top three finishers in the Kentucky Derby (Rich Strike, Epicenter and Zandon), Preakness winner Early Voting and Cyberknife, who had won the Haskell in his last start. Rich Strike started at odds of nearly 11/1 broke in at the start, settled on the inside, was urged along passing the five-eighths pole, saved ground under strong urging on the far turn, shifted three to four wide into the stretch and just missed the third place behind by  lengths from winner Epicenter followed by Cyberknife, with Zandon in third place. After returning to his home base in Lexington, Kentucky, trainer Reed was pleased, commenting, "He ran great. I didn't think we were going to beat Epicenter, but I truly believe we were the second-best horse. He was second best. I was very proud of him. He showed tremendous courage around the turn. He lost ground at the quarter pole and he came back. You don't see a lot of horses lose ground in the stretch and then come back like he did. I had to live 10 weeks hoping I could get him the credibility he deserved. I think he should have gotten that Saturday."

Lukas Classic

On October 1, Rich Strike returned to Churchill Downs—where he had won his only events, including the Kentucky Derby—to face older horses including Hot Rod Charlie, Art Collector and Happy Saver in the Grade II Lukas Classic Stakes. Starting as the 5/1 fourth choice, Rich Strike settled behind the leaders Art Collector and Hot Rod Charlie. He was just two lengths off the early leaders after a half-mile. As the horses rounded the turn into the stretch run Rich Strike came four wide but he seemed to relax somewhat upon making the lead at the sixteenth pole. He could have also grown a bit fatigued after racing closer to the leaders than usual in a race with little speed. Jockey Sonny Leon implored his mount to finish the race off with left-handed strikes in the closing sixteenth while simultaneously working to maintain his balance, as his saddle may have slipped to the left. The effort was nearly enough in the colt's first race against older horses but, in the end, he fell short by mere inches to Hot Rod Charlie. Sonny Leon was suspended 15 days by the Churchill Downs stewards for "intentionally attempting to interfere with and impede the progress of a rival by repeatedly making physical contact with another rider in the stretch".

Breeders’ Cup Classic

On November 5, 2022, the Breeders’ Cup Classic was run on Keeneland Racetrack in Lexington, Kentucky. The field included horses Flightline, Epicenter, Rich Strike, Hot Rod Charlie, Taiba, Life is Good, Olympiad and Happy Saver. Various pundits had predicted that no one was going to beat Flightline, and that proved to be so, with the horse finishing 8 1/4 lengths in front of Olympiad. Jockey Sonny Leon rode Rich Strike to a strong fourth place finish behind winner Flightline, Olympiad and Taiba. The colt seems to have been slowed by a faltering Epicenter, who suffered a track career-ending injury during the race. Dawson and Reed announced after the race that Rich Strike would likely now be rested to prepare for 2023.

Clark Stakes

Rich Strike ran in the Clark Stakes at Churchill Downs on Friday, November 22, 2022, on his reported favourite track for the 1 1/8 mile G1 race. The day before the race he was the favourite at 2-1 odds. It was his first 3 week turnaround. Sonny Leon rode. The horse did not do well, finished at the back of the pack. It was discovered post-race that he was quite ill. Rich Strike was treated for what trainer Eric Reed called a guttural pouch infection, and after recovery he was rested until mid-January 2023.

Year End 2022

Trainer Eric Reed worked on a race plan for the next year, as Rich Strike rested at a bluegrass farm at the end of 2022, and enjoyed “just being a horse”. Reed stated that Rich Strike’s 2022 team members will be in place for 2023, and “there is no plan to change them” — the Dixons, Leon, Lagune.

2023: four-year-old season

Rich Strike returned to the Mercury Training Centre in January, and began training for the 2023 year. He has not been raced as of March 2023.

Statistics

Legend:

Pedigree 

* Rich Strike is inbred 3s × 2d to the stallion Smart Strike, meaning that he appears third generation on the sire side of his pedigree and second generation on the dam side of his pedigree. Rich Strike is also inbred 4s × 4s to Deputy Minister, meaning he appears fourth generation twice on the sire side of the pedigree.

References

2019 racehorse births
Kentucky Derby winners
Racehorses bred in Kentucky
Racehorses trained in the United States
Thoroughbred family 9